David Payet is a member of the National Assembly of Seychelles.  A doctor by profession, he is a member of the Seychelles People's Progressive Front, and was first elected to the Assembly in 2007.

References

Year of birth missing (living people)
Living people
Members of the National Assembly (Seychelles)
People from Glacis, Seychelles
Seychellois physicians
United Seychelles Party politicians